Audo is a surname. Notable people with the surname include:

Joseph VI Audo (1790–1878), Iraqi Chaldean patriarch
Toma Audo (1854–1918), Iraqi Chaldean archbishop